is a broadcasting station in Fukuoka, Japan, and it is affiliated with National Radio Network (NRN) on radio and All-Nippon News Network (ANN) on TV.

With its relay transmitters in Saga, KBC functions as the default ANN affiliate for the said prefecture, as that area doesn't have an ANN affiliate of its own.

History

Early History 
After the establishment of the "Three Radio Laws" (Radio Law, Broadcasting Law, and Radio Supervisory Committee Establishment Law) in 1950, Japan established a system where public broadcasting (NHK) and commercial broadcasting coexisted.

Among the 16 companies that were able to receive the license, two of them are from Fukuoka Prefecture: Radio Kyushu (later renamed RKB Mainichi Broadcasting) and Nishinippon Broadcasting (not related to RNC in Kagawa Prefecture). However, due to the latter failing to raise enough funds, the license was then returned in January 1952. But the then founders of Nishinippon Broadcasting, Shigetomo Nakahara, did not give up and applied for a radio broadcasting license in 1953, which was then granted on May of the same year. With financial support from the Asahi Shimbun, Nishinippon Broadcasting was then renamed to Kyushu Asahi Broadcasting on August 18, 1953.

Founding 

Kyushu Asahi Broadcasting then opened on August 21, 1953 with its headquarters initially located in the Asahiya Department Store in Kurume City. On December 24, 1953, KBC began trial radio broadcasts, which officially started broadcasting on New Year's Day of 1954.

In 1956, KBC received an expansion license for its radio broadcast to extend its coverage to whole of Fukuoka.As part of its radio expansion, they permanently moved their headquarters to the Hananoseki Building in Nakasu, Fukuoka City on November 30, 1956.

Expansion to television broadcasting 
In October 1956, KBC applied for a TV broadcasting license for the Fukuoka City and Kokura areas. However, at that time, multiple companies applied for a TV license in the prefecture. Under the mediation of the Ministry of Post (currently the Ministry of Internal Affairs and Communications), KBC received their license on October 22, 1957.

After obtaining their license, KBC then planned to move its headquarters to Nagahama, Fukuoka City in order to meet the facility requirements for TV broadcasting. Prior to the start of TV broadcasting, KBC decided to become part of Fuji TV and Nippon Educational Television (NET) (current TV Asahi) affiliates. On July 15, 1958, KBC established its relay transmitter in Kokura City in Kitakyushu as part of its preparations for TV broadcasting.

KBC started its TV operations on March 1, 1959 at 10am. At that time it allotted to air at least 70% of programs from Nippon Educational Television and 30% of programs from Fuji TV. In July 1961, KBC obtained another license for the whole of Kitakyushu City in Fukuoka and started to place its relay transmitters on Mount Sarakura. Fuji TV programming has been dropped completely on the TV schedules of KBC on October 1, 1964 after Television Nishinippon decided to become part of FNN/FNS as their primary affiliate. This resulted to the increase of the time allotment for NET programming to 78%, with local programming increased to 22%. Color TV started on April 1, 1967.

In 1969, the Fukuoka District Court requested four television stations, including KBC (the other three being RKB Mainichi Broadcasting, Television Nishinippon, and NHK Fukuoka), to submit news footage of college students protesting the docking of a U.S. nuclear-powered aircraft carrier at Sasebo Port, but Kyushu Asahi Broadcasting refused to do so on the grounds that it infringed on press freedom. The newsreel was returned in December of the same year.

1970s - present 
In 1978, KBC opened its first ANN News Bureau in Vienna. KBC started TV broadcasting in stereo sound since 1982. On April 1, 1987, KBC opened its current headquarters. KBC then achieved broadcasting for 24 hours everyday since April 1, 1996. KBC started digital TV broadcasting on December 1, 2006 and stopped analog broadcasting on July 24, 2011.

Programming 
During its early years on TV, KBC produced a short 15 minute local news bulletin. In 1978, KBC began airing a proper local news bulletin which was named as KBC News Plaza. Currently their local news program is known as Shiritaka!, which started airing in 2018.

Asadesu(アサデス。)
Super J Channel Kyushu/Okinawa(スーパーJチャンネル 九州･沖縄)
KBC News Pia(KBCニュースピア)
Kyushu Kaido Story
Ruriiro no Sunadokei(るり色の砂時計)
Fukuoka Marathon
National High School Baseball Fukuoka Regional Tournament
Vana H Cup KBC Augusta

References 

Asahi Shimbun Company
All-Nippon News Network
Television stations in Japan
Radio in Japan
Radio stations established in 1954
Television channels and stations established in 1959
Mass media in Fukuoka